Lana Gehring (born August 21, 1990 in Chicago, Illinois) is an American short track speed skater. She competed for the United States at the 2010 Winter Olympics, winning a bronze medal as part of a relay team. She has qualified for a spot on the U.S. team for the 2018 Winter Olympics.

Career
At the 2010 Winter Olympics, in Vancouver, Gehring won a bronze medal as part of the 3000 m relay team. After failing to make the U.S. short track team for the 2014 Winter Olympics in Sochi, Gerhing retired from speed skating. She then began skating long track before returning to short track. In December 2017 she qualified for the U.S. short track team for the 2018 Winter Olympics.

References

External links
 ISU profile at SportResult.com 
 
 
 
 

1990 births
Living people
American female short track speed skaters
Olympic bronze medalists for the United States in short track speed skating
Medalists at the 2010 Winter Olympics
Short track speed skaters at the 2010 Winter Olympics
Short track speed skaters at the 2018 Winter Olympics
Speed skaters from Chicago
21st-century American women